, known by his ring name , is a Japanese professional wrestler. He co-founded the promotion Big Japan Pro Wrestling (BJW). Kojika is the oldest active Japanese wrestler as well as the one with the longest career, having debuted in 1963. He is also the oldest active wrestler in the world.

Career

Early career (1963–1967)
Kojika made his debut on October 13, 1963 for Japan Pro Wrestling Alliance (JWA) against Kakutaro Koma (future NWA World Middleweight Champion Mashio Koma). In 1967, he left Japan to wrestle in North America.

North America (1967-1970)
In 1967, Kojika made his debut in North America for NWA Mid-America in Tennessee. He teamed with Motoshi Okuma and they also worked for Georgia Championship Wrestling. They disbanded in 1968 and Kojika went to Florida, Detroit and St. Louis. In 1969, Kojika went to Los Angeles and won the NWA "Beat the Champ" Television Championship by defeating Pepper Martin on November 19. A month later he dropped the title back to Martin. On August 26, 1970, he defeated Les Roberts for the TV title and held it until losing to The Great Goliath on September 16. After the loss, Kojika went back to Japan.

Return to Japan and folding of JWA (1970–1973)
After a few years in the United States, Kojika returned to Japan and stayed with Japan Pro Wrestling Alliance until the company folded on April 14, 1973.

Return to North America (1973–1974, 1980)
In 1973, Kojika returned to the United States to wrestle in Texas as Kung Fu Lee. He would feud with Dory Funk Jr., Terry Funk, Ricky Romero and Akio Sato. He left Texas in 1974. In 1980, he went to Hawaii to work for NWA Polynesian.

All Japan Pro Wrestling (1973–1986)
After the folding of JWA, Kojika went to Giant Baba's All Japan Pro Wrestling (AJPW) where he reunited with Motoshi Okuma. From 1976 to 1981, he and Okuma won the All Asia Tag Team Championship three times. They were together until 1986 when Kojika retired from wrestling.

Big Japan Pro Wrestling (1995–2002)
Kojika returned to wrestling in 1995, co-founding Big Japan Pro Wrestling (BJW) with Kazuo Sakurada where it was a style based on deathmatches and King's Road style. He started wrestling again in 1996. He retired for the second time in 2002. He continued co-promoting Big Japan.

Second return to wrestling (2006–present)
In 2006, Kojika return to wrestling for the second time. He still wrestles for Big Japan and numerous Japanese promotions at 80 years old.

Return to All Japan Pro Wrestling (2019)
Kojika returned to All Japan Pro Wrestling in 2019 after having last worked for them in 1986.

Championships and accomplishments
All Japan Pro Wrestling
All Asia Tag Team Championship (4 times) – with Motoshi Okuma (3) and Gantetsu Matsuoka (1)
Big Japan Pro Wrestling
Yokohama Shopping Street 6-Man Tag Team Championship (1 time) – with Masato Inaba and Kankuro Hoshino
DDT Pro-Wrestling
Jiyūgaoka 6-Person Tag Team Championship (1 time) – with Mr. #6 and Riho
Sea Of Japan 6-Person Tag Team Championship (1 time) – with Mr. #6 and Riho
UWA World Trios Championship (1 time) – with Mr. #6 and Riho
National Wrestling Alliance
NWA Western States Heavyweight Championship (1 time)
NWA Hollywood Wrestling
NWA Americas Heavyweight Championship (1 times)
NWA Americas Tag Team Championship (2 times) – with Don Carson (1) and John Tolos (1)
Niigata Pro Wrestling
Niigata Tag Team Championship (2 times, current) – with Shigeno Shima (2)

References

External links
 

1942 births
Living people
Japanese male professional wrestlers
People from Hakodate
Sportspeople from Hokkaido
20th-century Japanese people
21st-century Japanese people
Big Japan Pro Wrestling
20th-century professional wrestlers
21st-century professional wrestlers
All Asia Tag Team Champions
UWA World Trios Champions
Jiyūgaoka 6-Person Tag Team Champions
Sea of Japan 6-Person Tag Team Champions
Yokohama Shopping Street 6-Man Tag Team Champions
NWA "Beat the Champ" Television Champions
NWA Americas Tag Team Champions
NWA Americas Heavyweight Champions